Flabellariopsis is a genus in the Malpighiaceae, a family of about 75 genera of flowering plants in the order Malpighiales. Flabellariopsis includes one species, Flabellariopsis acuminata, which occurs in equatorial Africa in riverine forests or in wet forests, dry evergreen forests, or wooded grasslands.

External links
 Malpighiaceae Malpighiaceae - description, taxonomy, phylogeny, and nomenclature
 Flabellariopsis

Malpighiaceae
Malpighiaceae genera
Monotypic Malpighiales genera